Alexander Kusenko is a theoretical physicist, astrophysicist, and cosmologist who is currently a Professor of Physics and Astronomy at the University of California, Los Angeles (UCLA).  In addition, Kusenko holds an appointment of Senior Scientist at the Kavli Institute for the Physics and Mathematics of the Universe (IPMU) since February 2008.  He has served as a general member of the board of Aspen Center for Physics 2004-2019.  Kusenko was awarded the status of Fellow of the American Physical Society in 2008 for original and seminal contributions to particle physics, astrophysics, and cosmology. In 2021, Kusenko was awarded a Simons Fellowship in Theoretical Physics. In 2021, he entered a $10,000 wager with Derek Muller over the possibility of sailing straight downwind faster than the wind, which he later conceded.

References

External links 

Scientific publications of Alexander Kusenko on INSPIRE-HEP

Scientists may have solved mystery of matter’s origin by Sarah Kaplan, The Washington Post
"Higgs Boson Could Explain Matter’s Dominance over Antimatter" by Clara Moskowitz, Scientific American

1966 births
Living people
American physicists
Fellows of the American Physical Society
American Physical Society
Moscow State University alumni
Stony Brook University alumni
University of California, Los Angeles faculty
People associated with CERN